Hudson Historic District may refer to:

in the United States
(by state then town)
 Hudson Downtown Historic District, Hudson, Michigan, listed on the National Register of Historic Places (NRHP)
Hudson River Heritage Historic District, a National Historic Landmark District in Barrytown, Germantown, Rhinecliff, Staatsburg, and Tivoli, in New York State
 Hudson Historic District (New York), Hudson, New York, listed on the NRHP
 Hudson Falls Historic District, Hudson Falls, New York, listed on the NRHP in Washington County
 Hudson Historic District (Ohio), listed on the NRHP in Summit County
 Hudson Avenue Historic District, Newark, Ohio, listed on the NRHP in Licking County